Miss This Kiss is the second extended play by South Korean girl group Laboum. It was released on April 17, 2017, by NH Media. It consists of six tracks, including the title track "Hwi Hwi".

The EP was a commercial success and topped the Gaon Album Chart. The single "Hwi Hwi"
also earned the group their first ever music show trophy since their debut on April 28, 2017 on the music show Music Bank.

Background and release
On March 15, 2017, Laboum's agency confirmed that the group is preparing to release an album in April. The group started releasing teasers for their new EP on April 10, and revealed the album's track list on April 14. On April 17, the EP was released digitally and physically worldwide.<ref>{{cite web|last1=Park|first1=Dong-je|title=신흥대세 걸그룹 라붐, 'MISS THIS KISS' 컴백 티저 살펴보니 박!'|url=http://www.breaknews.com/sub_read.html?uid=503673|website=Break News|date=April 12, 2017|accessdate=July 25, 2017}}</ref>

Promotion
A day after the album's release, the group had their comeback stage on The Show. They continued promoting their new song on other music shows for a few weeks.

Commercial performanceMiss This Kiss debuted atop the Gaon Album Chart and its title track "Hwi Hwi" earned the group their first music show trophy on the April 28 episode of Music Bank''. The group's win was a controversial one and raised suspicion as it was expected that solo singer IU would win after dominating the charts with her single "Palette". The album's sales of over 28,000 copies was also questioned, as this was almost ten times as much as their last album's sales. The group's agency denied the accusations and clarified that an endorsement deal caused the boost in sales since the company bought copies of the album for giveaways at events. The agency threatened to take legal action against those spreading rumours about the group.

Track listing
Digital download

Charts

Release history

References 

Korean-language EPs
2017 EPs